A shack is a type of small house, usually in a state of disrepair.

Shack or The Shack may also refer to:

Places
 The Shack (Williamsport, Ohio), a Registered Historic Place in Pickaway County, Ohio, United States
 The Shack Neighborhood House, a community center in Scotts Run, West Virginia, United States

People
 Shack (surname)
 Shick Shack (c. 1727–c. 1835), Native American chieftain
 James "Shack" Harris (born 1947), former American Football League and National Football League quarterback and National Football League executive
 Alonzo Shack Shealy (1874-1929), American college football player and head coach

Arts, entertainment, and media
 The Shack (Blasco Ibáñez novel), an 1898 Spanish novel by Vicente Blasco Ibáñez
 The Shack (1945 film), a Mexican film adaptation of the Ibanez novel
 The Shack (Young novel), a 2007 novel by William P. Young
 The Shack (2017 film), an American film adaptation of the Young novel
 Shack (band), an English alternative rock group formed in 1987
 Shack, the villain of the movie Emperor of the North Pole (1973), played by Ernest Borgnine
 Shacknews, a website about games, also known as "The Shack"
 The Shack (journalism), the police beat for journalists within the NYPD headquarters

Other uses
Shake Shack, an American fast casual restaurant chain based in New York City

See also
Shaquille O'Neal, American basketball player nicknamed Shaq
Shaq (disambiguation)